Denís Aleksándrovich Gúsev (born August 11, 1981) is a Russian professional bodybuilder, Master of Sports of Russia in bodybuilding.

He is the first Russian who:
 has won 3 professional tournaments in IFBB Pro League in the Men's Physique Pro category in Russia;
 has won a gold medal at the amateur Arnold Classic Europe 2013 in the Men's Physique category in the height category from 178 cm;
 ranked in the top 3 and won a silver medal in the Men's Physique category at the World Championship.

Adult years 
At 26 Denis moved to Moscow and started working at the leading premium “World Class” chain as a personal trainer. Since then Gusev is continuously improving his theoretical and practical knowledge by attending in-company and other fitness centers training, participating in international fitness conventions and developing himself, and reading a huge amount of specialized methodical literature. There are show business stars, businessmen, politicians and other nice people among his clients. At the same time, Gusev has not been left unnoticed by the fashion industry of his country because of his physical form. Denis took part in many fashion shows as a fitness model, as well as in numerous commercial and authorial photo and video projects of the most famous Russian photographers. This includes projects for Maxim, GQ, Wedding, Optika Magazine, Zhelezniy Mir and other magazines, as well as video shooting for “Megafon”, “Sinepark”, “Delta”, and “zoombi.ru” advertising companies. Denis was the face on “X fit” fitness chain ads. Also Denis was often on covers of Russian fitness magazines: twice on Muscle and Fitness, Iron World, Gerkules, Fitness Magazine, and Jornl.

Having good theoretical knowledge and experience of the sportsman, and possessing an excellent constitution of the body, Denis achieved high results in bodybuilding. In this case, Denis, who has an attractive appearance, participated in a large number of fashion shows as a fitness model, and got on the cover of magazines:

Currently, Denis is actively continuing his preparations for international competitions. With Denis, a lot of sports videos are filmed. The most famous video is Супер пресс. It describes the fitness model Denis Gusev on the YouTube network; it already exceeds 4 million views. In it Denis shares the secrets of drawing up a training program for abdominal muscles.

Sporting activities 
In 2012, at the age of 31 Denis decided to take part in a classical bodybuilding competition. The sportsman asked Dmitriy Yashankin, the most significant figure in Russia’s fitness community and a multiple world champion, for help in preparation. Dmitriy agreed to help Denis to cope with this uphill struggle. It took the sportsman 3 months to get in shape which helped him to reach the top 10 in this category in Russia. At his very first competition, Gusev won 8th place at the Russian Championship.

In 2013 he fulfilled the standard Master of Sports of Russia in bodybuilding, becoming a bronze medalist in the category "Classic bodybuilding over 180 cm", at the Cup of Russia in Krasnodar. And in the autumn Denis decided to perform in the new category "Men's Physique". In this category, the main criterion is the aesthetics and proportions of the body.

In the autumn season of 2013 Denis Gusev and his coach D. Yashankin made a common decision to compete in the new Men's Physique category. This category is aimed at those who want to develop a fit and aesthetically pleasing body. Denis Gusev won a gold medal at the Arnold Classic Europa tournament in the "Men's Physique" category, in the growth category from 178 cm, becoming the first Russian winner in this category. He was also the first Russian athlete to receive the IFBB Pro card in the Men's Physique category.

In the spring of 2014 Denis made his debut in the Men's Physique IFBB Professional League in the USA. Taking third place at the tournament in Dallas, Gusev became the first ever athlete not to play for the US, to get into the top 3 in the professional tournament in the Men's Physique category. Here are photos of the PRO-card Gusev Denis.

In the autumn of 2015, Denis won the Neva Pro Show tournament, becoming the first Russian athlete who took the first place in the IFBB Pro League tournament. Thanks to this victory, Denis qualified for the main tournament in the world of bodybuilding, the famous "Mr. Olympia" - 2016, which takes place every year at Las Vegas.

Awards 
 In 2015, Denis Gusev, was named the most successful media and PRO-bodybuilder in the Russian version of the "Iron Rating" channel.
 In September 2016, Denis received the award of Iron world magazine — Fitness & Media Awards 2016 in the category "Blogger of the year". For a series of video clips see "Road to Olympia".
 In December 2016, Denis was named "Winner of the battle in the media field in Russia", according to Team EastLabs.
 In December 2016, Denis was named “The winner of the battle on the media field of Russia", according to the portal "Team EastLabs".
 In April 2017, Denis was awarded a diploma from the Bodybuilding Federation of Russia for “Great contribution to the development of bodybuilding and fitness in Russia.
 In 2018, Denis was recognized as the most popular and popular athlete according to the version of the sports channel Bodymania. «Bodymania» 
 In 2018, Denis was recognized as the most media face of Russian bodybuilding and fitness according to the portal "Team EastLabs" 
 In 2019, Denis was awarded the Book of Records of Russia as " the Winner of the largest number of professional tournaments IFBB PRO LEAGUE" "The Book of Records of Russia".

Contracts 
History of sponsorship contracts with Denis Gusev:

Contest history

Amateur competitions

Professional competitions

References

Links 
 Official site #1:  Denis's website
 Official site #2:  Denis's website #2
 
 
 

1981 births
Living people
People from Tikhoretsk
Professional bodybuilders
Russian bodybuilders
Russian television presenters
Russian male models
Sportspeople from Krasnodar Krai